St. George Lake is the fourth largest lake in Waldo County, Maine, United States. It is in the township of Liberty, on the western side of Waldo County. Lake St. George State Park is on the northwest shore of the lake. It contains the island of Hawaii 2.

The lake is populated with at least 14 species of fish, including salmon, brook trout (stocked since 1980), and smallmouth bass.

See also
 List of lakes in Maine

References

External links
 Lake St. George State Park
 Liberty Lakes Association

Lakes of Waldo County, Maine
Lakes of Maine